Melville Brandt (June 18, 1919 – March 14, 2008) was an actor and NBC staff announcer.

Born in Brooklyn, New York, Brandt joined NBC around 1948. His radio announcing credits included The Adventures of Frank Merriwell, Author Meets the Critics, and The Eternal Light. In 1975, he announced for a syndicated radio program called Faces of Love.

He was one of the stars of the first television soap opera, Faraway Hill, broadcast in 1946 on the DuMont Television Network. His familiar voice was heard over the second animated version of the NBC Peacock from 1962–75, announcing that "the following program is brought to you in 'living color' on NBC." He announced the opening of the television soap opera, The Doctors. His introduction was "The Doctors: The Emmy Award winning program, dedicated to the brotherhood of healing."

Brandt was the series announcer for other NBC-TV programs including The Bell Telephone Hour  from 1959 through 1968, and GE College Bowl on NBC from 1963–70, in which his introduction was "Match wits with the champions in America's favorite question and answer game, live from New York, the General Electric College Bowl,", and after a brief plug for General Electric would introduce "the man with the questions, Robert Earle."

Brandt replaced Don Pardo as the announcer on Saturday Night Live during the 1981-82 season – except for two episodes from that season in which Brandt was replaced by Bill Hanrahan, better known then as the voice of NBC Nightly News.

References

1919 births
2008 deaths
People from Brooklyn
American male soap opera actors
Male actors from New York (state)
American male voice actors
NBC network announcers
Radio and television announcers
Place of death missing
20th-century American male actors